is a Japanese football player. He plays for Albirex Niigata Singapore.

Club statistics

References

External links

1990 births
Living people
Association football people from Fukuoka Prefecture
Japanese footballers
J1 League players
J2 League players
Avispa Fukuoka players
Association football goalkeepers